San Antonio Canyon is a submarine canyon located ofshore San Antonio, Valparaíso Region, Chile. The canyon crosses almost the whole continental shelf. It has a slope of 2° from its upper parts near the coast to 80 km offshore, then slope increases to a mean of 6.3°. The main channel has a large tributary coming from the south.

References

Landforms of Valparaíso Region
Submarine canyons of the Pacific Ocean